Niladhwaj (reigned 1440–1460) was a king of the Kamata kingdom and founder of the  Khen dynasty. He ruled from the city of Kamatapur (now called Gosanimari) and was succeeded by his son Chakradhwaj.

References

People from Assam
15th-century Indian monarchs
Year of birth missing
1460 deaths